The 2009–10 Slovenian Basketball League (official: 2009–10 Telemach League) was the 19th season of the Premier A Slovenian Basketball League, the highest professional basketball league in Slovenia. Krka Novo Mesto won its 3rd national championship.

Teams for the 2009–10 season

Regular season

P=Matches played, W=Matches won, L=Matches lost, F=Points for, A=Points against, Pts=Points

Champions standings

P=Matches played, W=Matches won, L=Matches lost, F=Points for, A=Points against, Pts=Points

Relegation league

P=Matches played, W=Matches won, L=Matches lost, F=Points for, A=Points against, Pts=Points

Playoffs

Relegation Playoffs

Awards

Regular Season MVP
  Shawn King (Hopsi Polzela)

Season MVP
  Shawn King (Hopsi Polzela)

Finals MVP
  Smiljan Pavič (Krka)

Statistics leaders 

| width=50% valign=top |

Points

|}
|}

| width=50% valign=top |

Assists

|}
|}

External links
Official Basketball Federation of Slovenia website 

Slovenian Basketball League seasons
Slovenia
1